Sir Henry at N'didi's Kraal is the fourth and final solo album by Vivian Stanshall. It is a return to the largely spoken-word, solo comedy format of Stanshall's second album Sir Henry at Rawlinson End and is a sequel to the same work.

Background

Sir Henry at N'didi's Kraal continues the story of the dissolute aristocrat and explorer Sir Henry Rawlinson, this time dealing with his attempts on behalf of the "Geographic Society" to locate a lost tribe of Zulus in South Africa. In contrast to Sir Henry at Rawlinson End, it is almost entirely spoken word, with only one song included. The album is predominantly a parody of the colonial manners and attitudes of the British Empire, using Sir Henry as a mouthpiece for various ridiculous and sometimes racist philosophies which Stanshall could spoof. It has been described as "a contradictory mix of Sir Henry's belief in racial superiority and (Stanshall's) genuine affection for African culture."

The album was recorded at a low point in Stanshall's life following his separation from his second wife Ki Longfellow and their young family, during which he was suffering from severe alcohol and prescription medicine abuse. Stanshall was unhappy with the album's unpolished content, editing and low production values and subsequently disowned it. The producer, Glen Colson, has defended the release and his own work on it by protesting that Stanshall's depressed and intoxicated state diminished his creative input and that Colson himself was obliged to finish the album as best he could.

Although Stanshall would continue to produce one-off recordings, advertisements and the comic opera Stinkfoot, Sir Henry at N'didi's Kraal is his final album.

Track listing

 "Sir Henry at N'didi's Kraal" - 51:42

Personnel

Vivian Stanshall - vocals and narration, trumpet, percussion
Suzie Honeyman - violin
Sean Oliver - bass guitar
Jon Glyn - saxophone
John Scott - footsteps
Bruce Smith - drums
Mario Tavares - producer
Simon The Lodger - unexplained contribution
Ralph Steadman - artwork

References

1984 albums
Vivian Stanshall albums
Spoken word albums by British artists